Westwick may refer to:

Places

United Kingdom

England
Westwick, Cambridgeshire
Westwick, County Durham
Westwick, North Yorkshire
Westwick, Norfolk

People
Bill Westwick (1908–1990), Canadian sports journalist
Ed Westwick (b.1987), English actor and singer
Rat Westwick (1876-1957), Canadian sportsman
Thomas Westwick (1887-1963), Canadian ice hockey player

See also 
Westwick Row, a place in Hertfordshire, England, United Kingdom
West Wick, an area of Weston-super-Mare, Somerset, England, United Kingdom